Hala the Accuser is a fictional character appearing in American comic books published by Marvel Comics. She first appeared in Guardians of Knowhere #3 and was created by Brian Michael Bendis and Valerio Schiti. She is a member of the Kree Accuser Corps.

Publication history
Hala the Accuser first appeared in Guardians of Knowhere #3 and was created by Brian Michael Bendis and Valerio Schiti.

Fictional character biography
Hala the Accuser is a member of the Kree Empire's Accuser Corps. She was the last of its members when Hala was destroyed during the fall of the Kree Empire as seen in The Black Vortex storyline.

During the Secret Wars storyline, Hala the Accuser ended up on Knowhere where it orbited Battleworld following the final incursion that followed the incursions seen in the Time Runs Out storyline. She first appeared when the Guardians of Knowhere defeated Yotat the Destroyer. As Hala the Accuser spoke only Kree language, Gamora and the Angela who worked for the Thor Corps had a hard time dealing with her when she attacked them. Hala the Accuser even defeated and slew many of the Nova Corps who were residing on Knowhere. Hala then killed the Thor Corps Angela before being defeated by Gamora with the help of Drax the Destroyer and Rocket Raccoon.

As part of the All-New, All-Different Marvel following Mister Fantastic rebuilding the Multiverse, Hala the Accuser went after Gamora and found her on Spartax. The Guardians of the Galaxy fought against Hala the Accuser. Even though Thing knocked Hala the Accuser unconscious, Drax the Destroyer unknowingly activated a failsafe in Hala the Accuser's Universal Weapon enabling her to regain conscious and gain the upper hand against the Guardians of the Galaxy. She then placed Emperor Peter Quill in an escape pod so that he could watch Hala the Accuser destroy Spartax as she also planned to do the same thing to Earth as part of her revenge for his part in the near-genocide of the Kree. As Hala the Accuser continued wreaking havoc on Spartax, she defeated the Spartax Royal Guards before she realized that the Guardians of the Galaxy had retreated and regrouped. As Gamora sacrificed herself to confront Hala the Accuser, she bought the rest of the Guardians of the Galaxy time for them to get away and rescue Peter Quill. Upon realizing that Peter Quill was no longer in her grasp, Hala the Accuser continued beating up Gamora to get the information on what she did with him. In the nick of time, the rest of the Guardians of the Galaxy arrived in an attempt to talk Hala the Accuser out of destroying Spartax. When Hala didn't give in to their plea, Kitty Pryde phased Hala the Accuser through the ground, Thing jumped from a high distance enough to knock out Hala the Accuser, and Venom broke her staff. During the attack by Yotat the Destroyer, Hala the Accuser was shown crawling through the sewers and was arrested by the Spartax Royal Guard when they found her. The Spartax Council decided to deport Hala the Accuser back to what remained of the Kree Empire.

Powers and abilities
As a Kree warrior in peak physical condition, Hala the Accuser possesses her species' unique physiology, having far greater natural attributes than a human. Thus, Hala's body is resistant to poisons, toxins and diseases.

In other media

Film
 Hala the Accuser appears in Marvel Rising: Secret Warriors, voiced by Ming-Na Wen. Hala recruits embittered Inhuman Victor Kohl/Exile to capture young Inhumans so Hala can use them as weapons for the Kree Empire. Coming into conflict with the newly formed superhero team Secret Warriors and Captain Marvel, Hala's ship is damaged and her plans are ruined, while Hala herself is ejected into space.

Television
 Hala returns in Marvel Rising: Heart of Iron, once again voiced by Ming-Na Wen. She targets the Kree devices held at a university by Tony Stark leading to her latest battle with the Secret Warriors and Captain Marvel. Then she poses as Daisy Johnson to get into Riri Williams' room and steal the A.M.I. A.I. Using some components, Hala builds a doomsday device that emits a purple slime with tentacles. Her plot was foiled when Riri removed A.M.I.'s arc reactor, before to escape.

Video games
 Hala the Accuser appears in Guardians of the Galaxy: The Telltale Series, voiced by Faye Kingslee. She, her second-in-command Jyn-Xar, and her army of Kree soldiers managed to steal the Eternity Forge from Peter and escape after damaging the Milano. Upon choosing either Gamora or Drax the Destroyer to accompany him, Star-Lord arrives on the Kree ship to confront Hala the Accuser who plans to use the Eternity Forge to resurrect her son Bal-Dinn and the entire Kree race as the Kree and their entire planet were destroyed by Thanos. This apparently will require numerous sacrifices in the process. She critically wounds Peter with her lance. Rocket Raccoon manages to get the ship running to allow the two to escape from Hala the Accuser and Star-Lord manages to obtain the Eternity Forge back in the process which eventually heals him. In episode 2, Hala the Accuser pursues the Guardians of the Galaxy to obtain the Eternity Forge. After the Guardians of the Galaxy fight off a Kree ambush on the Milano, Hala the Accuser contacts Star-Lord telling him that he can't run forever and that the Eternity Forge will be hers. In episode 3, Hala the Accuser and her Kree forces catch up to the Guardians of the Galaxy and Mantis at the shrine  on the planet Dronbino at the time when Star-Lord is given the choice to either destroy the Eternity Forge or empower it. The choices Star-Lord makes will either have Hala the Accuser burned but empowered by its destruction or successfully reviving Bal-Dinn with plans to revive the dead Kree that are with her. In episode 4, the episode returned with either Hala burned and empowered, or managed to get the Eternity Forge, successfully reviving her son and the dead Kree. Then the shrine begins to collapse, while the Guardians fight off Hala and the Kree, the Guardians fall off the shrine, and Hala watch them fall. Later on after the Guardians escape the Shrine, Hala and the Kree started a violent attack on D’Bari V, killing millions to proceed to revive the rest of the dead Kree. In episode 5, the Guardians of the Galaxy and Mantis unite to fight Hala where Hala's outcome varies upon her defeat. One outcome will have her either be handed over to Bal-Dinn to face Kree justice or the Nova Corps. Another outcome will have Hala either killed by Bal-Dinn or dying when the remnants of the Eternity Forge leaving her body.

References

External links
 Hala the Accuser at Marvel Wiki
 Hala the Accuser at Comic Vine
 Hala the Accuser at Comic Book Realm

Characters created by Brian Michael Bendis
Kree
Marvel Comics characters who can move at superhuman speeds
Marvel Comics characters with superhuman strength
Marvel Comics extraterrestrial supervillains
Marvel Comics female supervillains
Marvel Comics supervillains